Game theory is the study of mathematical models of strategic interactions among rational agents. It has applications in all fields of social science, as well as in logic, systems science and computer science. Originally, it addressed two-person zero-sum games, in which each participant's gains or losses are exactly balanced by those of other participants. In the 21st century, game theory applies to a wide range of behavioral relations; it is now an umbrella term for the science of logical decision making in humans, animals, as well as computers.

Modern game theory began with the idea of mixed-strategy equilibria in two-person zero-sum game and its proof by John von Neumann. Von Neumann's original proof used the Brouwer fixed-point theorem on continuous mappings into compact convex sets, which became a standard method in game theory and mathematical economics. His paper was followed by the 1944 book Theory of Games and Economic Behavior, co-written with Oskar Morgenstern, which considered cooperative games of several players. The second edition of this book provided an axiomatic theory of expected utility, which allowed mathematical statisticians and economists to treat decision-making under uncertainty.

Game theory was developed extensively in the 1950s by many scholars. It was explicitly applied to evolution in the 1970s, although similar developments go back at least as far as the 1930s. Game theory has been widely recognized as an important tool in many fields. , with the Nobel Memorial Prize in Economic Sciences going to game theorists Paul Milgrom and Robert B. Wilson, fifteen game theorists have won the economics Nobel Prize. John Maynard Smith was awarded the Crafoord Prize for his application of evolutionary game theory.

History

Precursors
Discussions on the mathematics of games began long before the rise of modern mathematical game theory. Cardano's work on games of chance in Liber de ludo aleae (Book on Games of Chance), which was written around 1564 but published posthumously in 1663, formulated some of the field's basic ideas. In the 1650s, Pascal and Huygens developed the concept of expectation on reasoning about the structure of games of chance, and Huygens published his gambling calculus in De ratiociniis in ludo aleæ (On Reasoning in Games of Chance) in 1657.

In 1713, a letter attributed to Charles Waldegrave analyzed a game called "le Her". He was an active Jacobite and uncle to James Waldegrave, a British diplomat. In this letter, Waldegrave provided a minimax mixed strategy solution to a two-person version of the card game le Her, and the problem is now known as Waldegrave problem. In his 1838  (Researches into the Mathematical Principles of the Theory of Wealth), Antoine Augustin Cournot considered a duopoly and presented a solution that is the Nash equilibrium of the game.

In 1913, Ernst Zermelo published  (On an Application of Set Theory to the Theory of the Game of Chess), which proved that the optimal chess strategy is strictly determined. This paved the way for more general theorems.

In 1938, the Danish mathematical economist Frederik Zeuthen proved that the mathematical model had a winning strategy by using Brouwer's fixed point theorem. In his 1938 book  and earlier notes, Émile Borel proved a minimax theorem for two-person zero-sum matrix games only when the pay-off matrix is symmetric and provided a solution to a non-trivial infinite game (known in English as Blotto game). Borel conjectured the non-existence of mixed-strategy equilibria in finite two-person zero-sum games, a conjecture that was proved false by von Neumann.

Birth and early developments

Game theory did not exist as a unique field until John von Neumann published the paper On the Theory of Games of Strategy  in 1928. Von Neumann's original proof used Brouwer's fixed-point theorem on continuous mappings into compact convex sets, which became a standard method in game theory and mathematical economics. His paper was followed by his 1944 book Theory of Games and Economic Behavior co-authored with Oskar Morgenstern. The second edition of this book provided an axiomatic theory of utility, which reincarnated Daniel Bernoulli's old theory of utility (of money) as an independent discipline. Von Neumann's work in game theory culminated in this 1944 book. This foundational work contains the method for finding mutually consistent solutions for two-person zero-sum games. Subsequent work focused primarily on cooperative game theory, which analyzes optimal strategies for groups of individuals, presuming that they can enforce agreements between them about proper strategies.

In 1950, the first mathematical discussion of the prisoner's dilemma appeared, and an experiment was undertaken by notable mathematicians Merrill M. Flood and Melvin Dresher, as part of the RAND Corporation's investigations into game theory. RAND pursued the studies because of possible applications to global nuclear strategy. Around this same time, John Nash developed a criterion for mutual consistency of players' strategies known as the Nash equilibrium, applicable to a wider variety of games than the criterion proposed by von Neumann and Morgenstern. Nash proved that every finite n-player, non-zero-sum (not just two-player zero-sum) non-cooperative game has what is now known as a Nash equilibrium in mixed strategies.

Game theory experienced a flurry of activity in the 1950s, during which the concepts of the core, the extensive form game, fictitious play, repeated games, and the Shapley value were developed. The 1950s also saw the first applications of game theory to philosophy and political science.

Prize-winning achievements
In 1965, Reinhard Selten introduced his solution concept of subgame perfect equilibria, which further refined the Nash equilibrium. Later he would introduce trembling hand perfection as well. In 1994 Nash, Selten and Harsanyi became Economics Nobel Laureates for their contributions to economic game theory.

In the 1970s, game theory was extensively applied in biology, largely as a result of the work of John Maynard Smith and his evolutionarily stable strategy. In addition, the concepts of correlated equilibrium, trembling hand perfection, and common knowledge were introduced and analyzed.

In 2005, game theorists Thomas Schelling and Robert Aumann followed Nash, Selten, and Harsanyi as Nobel Laureates. Schelling worked on dynamic models, early examples of evolutionary game theory. Aumann contributed more to the equilibrium school, introducing equilibrium coarsening and correlated equilibria, and developing an extensive formal analysis of the assumption of common knowledge and of its consequences.

In 2007, Leonid Hurwicz, Eric Maskin, and Roger Myerson were awarded the Nobel Prize in Economics "for having laid the foundations of mechanism design theory". Myerson's contributions include the notion of proper equilibrium, and an important graduate text: Game Theory, Analysis of Conflict. Hurwicz introduced and formalized the concept of incentive compatibility.

In 2012, Alvin E. Roth and Lloyd S. Shapley were awarded the Nobel Prize in Economics "for the theory of stable allocations and the practice of market design". In 2014, the Nobel went to game theorist Jean Tirole.

Game types

Cooperative / non-cooperative

A game is cooperative if the players are able to form binding commitments externally enforced (e.g. through contract law). A game is non-cooperative if players cannot form alliances or if all agreements need to be self-enforcing (e.g. through credible threats).

Cooperative games are often analyzed through the framework of cooperative game theory, which focuses on predicting which coalitions will form, the joint actions that groups take, and the resulting collective payoffs. It is opposed to the traditional non-cooperative game theory which focuses on predicting individual players' actions and payoffs and analyzing Nash equilibria. The focus on individual payoff can result in a phenomenon known as Tragedy of the Commons, where resources are used to a collectively inefficient level. The lack of formal negotiation leads to the deterioration of public goods through over-use and under provision that stems from private incentives.

Cooperative game theory provides a high-level approach as it describes only the structure, strategies, and payoffs of coalitions, whereas non-cooperative game theory also looks at how bargaining procedures will affect the distribution of payoffs within each coalition. As non-cooperative game theory is more general, cooperative games can be analyzed through the approach of non-cooperative game theory (the converse does not hold) provided that sufficient assumptions are made to encompass all the possible strategies available to players due to the possibility of external enforcement of cooperation. While using a single theory may be desirable, in many instances insufficient information is available to accurately model the formal procedures available during the strategic bargaining process, or the resulting model would be too complex to offer a practical tool in the real world. In such cases, cooperative game theory provides a simplified approach that allows analysis of the game at large without having to make any assumption about bargaining powers.

Symmetric / asymmetric

A symmetric game is a game where the payoffs for playing a particular strategy depend only on the other strategies employed, not on who is playing them. That is, if the identities of the players can be changed without changing the payoff to the strategies, then a game is symmetric. Many of the commonly studied 2×2 games are symmetric. The standard representations of chicken, the prisoner's dilemma, and the stag hunt are all symmetric games. Some scholars would consider certain asymmetric games as examples of these games as well. However, the most common payoffs for each of these games are symmetric.

The most commonly studied asymmetric games are games where there are not identical strategy sets for both players. For instance, the ultimatum game and similarly the dictator game have different strategies for each player. It is possible, however, for a game to have identical strategies for both players, yet be asymmetric. For example, the game pictured in this section's graphic is asymmetric despite having identical strategy sets for both players.

Zero-sum / non-zero-sum

Zero-sum games (more generally, constant-sum games) are games in which choices by players can neither increase nor decrease the available resources. In zero-sum games, the total benefit goes to all players in a game, for every combination of strategies, always adds to zero (more informally, a player benefits only at the equal expense of others). Poker exemplifies a zero-sum game (ignoring the possibility of the house's cut), because one wins exactly the amount one's opponents lose. Other zero-sum games include matching pennies and most classical board games including Go and chess.

Many games studied by game theorists (including the famed prisoner's dilemma) are non-zero-sum games, because the outcome has net results greater or less than zero. Informally, in non-zero-sum games, a gain by one player does not necessarily correspond with a loss by another.

Constant-sum games correspond to activities like theft and gambling, but not to the fundamental economic situation in which there are potential gains from trade. It is possible to transform any constant-sum game into a (possibly asymmetric) zero-sum game by adding a dummy player (often called "the board") whose losses compensate the players' net winnings.

Simultaneous / sequential

Simultaneous games are games where both players move simultaneously, or instead the later players are unaware of the earlier players' actions (making them effectively simultaneous). Sequential games (or dynamic games) are games where later players have some knowledge about earlier actions. This need not be perfect information about every action of earlier players; it might be very little knowledge. For instance, a player may know that an earlier player did not perform one particular action, while they do not know which of the other available actions the first player actually performed.

The difference between simultaneous and sequential games is captured in the different representations discussed above. Often, normal form is used to represent simultaneous games, while extensive form is used to represent sequential ones. The transformation of extensive to normal form is one way, meaning that multiple extensive form games correspond to the same normal form. Consequently, notions of equilibrium for simultaneous games are insufficient for reasoning about sequential games; see subgame perfection.

In short, the differences between sequential and simultaneous games are as follows:

Cournot Competition  
The Cournot competition model involves players choosing quantity of a homogenous product to produce independently and simultaneously, where marginal cost can be different for each firm and the firm's payoff is profit. The production costs are public information and the firm aims to find their profit-maximizing quantity based on what they believe the other firm will produce and behave like monopolies. In this game firms want to produce at the monopoly quantity but there is a high incentive to deviate and produce more, which decreases the market-clearing price. For example, firms may be tempted to deviate from the monopoly quantity if there is a low monopoly quantity and high price, with the aim of increasing production to maximize  profit. However this option does not provide the highest payoff, as a firm's ability to maximize profits depends on its market share and the elasticity of the market demand. The Cournot equilibrium is reached when each firm operates on their reaction function with no incentive to deviate, as they have the best response based on the other firms output. Within the game, firms reach the Nash equilibrium when the Cournot equilibrium is achieved.

Bertrand Competition 

The Bertrand competition, assumes homogenous products and a constant marginal cost and players choose the prices. The equilibrium of price competition is where the price is equal to marginal costs, assuming complete information about the competitors' costs. Therefore, the firms have an incentive to deviate from the equilibrium because a homogenous product with a lower price will gain all of the market share, known as a cost advantage.

Perfect information and imperfect information

An important subset of sequential games consists of games of perfect information. A game is one of perfect information if all players, at every move in the game, know the moves previously made by all other players. In reality, this can be applied to firms and consumers having information about price and quality of all the available goods in a market. An imperfect information game is played when the players do not know all moves already made by the opponent such as a simultaneous move game.  Most games studied in game theory are imperfect-information games. Examples of perfect-information games include tic-tac-toe, checkers, chess, and Go.

Many card games are games of imperfect information, such as poker and bridge. Perfect information is often confused with complete information, which is a similar concept. Complete information requires that every player know the strategies and payoffs available to the other players but not necessarily the actions taken, whereas perfect information is knowledge of all aspects of the game and players. Games of incomplete information can be reduced, however, to games of imperfect information by introducing "moves by nature".

Bayesian game 

One of the assumptions of the Nash equilibrium is that every player has correct beliefs about the actions of the other players. However, there are many situations in game theory where participants do not fully understand the characteristics of their opponents. Negotiators may be unaware of their opponent's valuation of the object of negotiation, companies may be unaware of their opponent's cost functions, combatants may be unaware of their opponent's strengths, and jurors may be unaware of their colleague's interpretation of the evidence at trial. In some cases, participants may know the character of their opponent well, but may not know how well their opponent knows his or her own character.

Bayesian game means a strategic game with incomplete information. For a strategic game, decision makers are players, and every player has a group of actions. A core part of the imperfect information specification is the set of states. Every state completely describes a collection of characteristics relevant to the player such as their preferences and details about them. There must be a state for every set of features that some player believes may exist.

For example, where Player 1 is unsure whether Player 2 would rather date her or get away from her, while Player 2 understands Player 1's preferences as before. To be specific, supposing that Player 1 believes that Player 2 wants to date her under a probability of 1/2 and get away from her under a probability of 1/2 (this evaluation comes from Player 1's experience probably: she faces players who want to date her half of the time in such a case and players who want to avoid her half of the time). Due to the probability involved, the analysis  of this situation requires to understand the player's preference for the draw, even though people are only interested in pure strategic equilibrium.

Combinatorial games 

Games in which the difficulty of finding an optimal strategy stems from the multiplicity of possible moves are called combinatorial games. Examples include chess and Go. Games that involve imperfect information may also have a strong combinatorial character, for instance backgammon. There is no unified theory addressing combinatorial elements in games. There are, however, mathematical tools that can solve some particular problems and answer some general questions.

Games of perfect information have been studied in combinatorial game theory, which has developed novel representations, e.g. surreal numbers, as well as combinatorial and algebraic (and sometimes non-constructive) proof methods to solve games of certain types, including "loopy" games that may result in infinitely long sequences of moves. These methods address games with higher combinatorial complexity than those usually considered in traditional (or "economic") game theory. A typical game that has been solved this way is Hex. A related field of study, drawing from computational complexity theory, is game complexity, which is concerned with estimating the computational difficulty of finding optimal strategies.

Research in artificial intelligence has addressed both perfect and imperfect information games that have very complex combinatorial structures (like chess, go, or backgammon) for which no provable optimal strategies have been found. The practical solutions involve computational heuristics, like alpha–beta pruning or use of artificial neural networks trained by reinforcement learning, which make games more tractable in computing practice.

Infinitely long games

Games, as studied by economists and real-world game players, are generally finished in finitely many moves. Pure mathematicians are not so constrained, and set theorists in particular study games that last for infinitely many moves, with the winner (or other payoff) not known until after all those moves are completed.

The focus of attention is usually not so much on the best way to play such a game, but whether one player has a winning strategy. (It can be proven, using the axiom of choice, that there are gameseven with perfect information and where the only outcomes are "win" or "lose"for which neither player has a winning strategy.) The existence of such strategies, for cleverly designed games, has important consequences in descriptive set theory.

Discrete and continuous games
Much of game theory is concerned with finite, discrete games that have a finite number of players, moves, events, outcomes, etc. Many concepts can be extended, however. Continuous games allow players to choose a strategy from a continuous strategy set. For instance, Cournot competition is typically modeled with players' strategies being any non-negative quantities, including fractional quantities.

Differential games
Differential games such as the continuous pursuit and evasion game are continuous games where the evolution of the players' state variables is governed by differential equations. The problem of finding an optimal strategy in a differential game is closely related to the optimal control theory. In particular, there are two types of strategies: the open-loop strategies are found using the Pontryagin maximum principle while the closed-loop strategies are found using Bellman's Dynamic Programming method.

A particular case of differential games are the games with a random time horizon. In such games, the terminal time is a random variable with a given probability distribution function. Therefore, the players maximize the mathematical expectation of the cost function. It was shown that the modified optimization problem can be reformulated as a discounted differential game over an infinite time interval.

Evolutionary game theory
Evolutionary game theory studies players who adjust their strategies over time according to rules that are not necessarily rational or farsighted.  In general, the evolution of strategies over time according to such rules is modeled as a Markov chain with a state variable such as the current strategy profile or how the game has been played in the recent past. Such rules may feature imitation, optimization, or survival of the fittest.

In biology, such models can represent evolution, in which offspring adopt their parents' strategies and parents who play more successful strategies (i.e. corresponding to higher payoffs) have a greater number of offspring. In the social sciences, such models typically represent strategic adjustment by players who play a game many times within their lifetime and, consciously or unconsciously, occasionally adjust their strategies.

Stochastic outcomes (and relation to other fields)
Individual decision problems with stochastic outcomes are sometimes considered "one-player games". They may be modeled using similar tools within the related disciplines of decision theory, operations research, and areas of artificial intelligence, particularly AI planning (with uncertainty) and multi-agent system. Although these fields may have different motivators, the mathematics involved are substantially the same, e.g. using Markov decision processes (MDP).

Stochastic outcomes can also be modeled in terms of game theory by adding a randomly acting player who makes "chance moves" ("moves by nature"). This player is not typically considered a third player in what is otherwise a two-player game, but merely serves to provide a roll of the dice where required by the game.

For some problems, different approaches to modeling stochastic outcomes may lead to different solutions. For example, the difference in approach between MDPs and the minimax solution is that the latter considers the worst-case over a set of adversarial moves, rather than reasoning in expectation about these moves given a fixed probability distribution. The minimax approach may be advantageous where stochastic models of uncertainty are not available, but may also be overestimating extremely unlikely (but costly) events, dramatically swaying the strategy in such scenarios if it is assumed that an adversary can force such an event to happen. (See Black swan theory for more discussion on this kind of modeling issue, particularly as it relates to predicting and limiting losses in investment banking.)

General models that include all elements of stochastic outcomes, adversaries, and partial or noisy observability (of moves by other players) have also been studied. The "gold standard" is considered to be partially observable stochastic game (POSG), but few realistic problems are computationally feasible in POSG representation.

Metagames
These are games the play of which is the development of the rules for another game, the target or subject game. Metagames seek to maximize the utility value of the rule set developed. The theory of metagames is related to mechanism design theory.

The term metagame analysis is also used to refer to a practical approach developed by Nigel Howard, whereby a situation is framed as a strategic game in which stakeholders try to realize their objectives by means of the options available to them. Subsequent developments have led to the formulation of confrontation analysis.

Pooling games
These are games prevailing over all forms of society. Pooling games are repeated plays with changing payoff table in general over an experienced path, and their equilibrium strategies usually take a form of evolutionary social convention and economic convention. Pooling game theory emerges to formally recognize the interaction between optimal choice in one play and the emergence of forthcoming payoff table update path, identify the invariance existence and robustness, and predict variance over time. The theory is based upon topological transformation classification of payoff table update over time to predict variance and invariance, and is also within the jurisdiction of the computational law of reachable optimality for ordered system.

Mean field game theory
Mean field game theory is the study of strategic decision making in very large populations of small interacting agents. This class of problems was considered in the economics literature by Boyan Jovanovic and Robert W. Rosenthal, in the engineering literature by Peter E. Caines, and by mathematicians Pierre-Louis Lions and Jean-Michel Lasry.

Representation of games

The games studied in game theory are well-defined mathematical objects. To be fully defined, a game must specify the following elements: the players of the game, the information and actions available to each player at each decision point, and the payoffs for each outcome. (Eric Rasmusen refers to these four "essential elements" by the acronym "PAPI".) A game theorist typically uses these elements, along with a solution concept of their choosing, to deduce a set of equilibrium strategies for each player such that, when these strategies are employed, no player can profit by unilaterally deviating from their strategy. These equilibrium strategies determine an equilibrium to the game—a stable state in which either one outcome occurs or a set of outcomes occur with known probability.

Most cooperative games are presented in the characteristic function form, while the extensive and the normal forms are used to define noncooperative games.

Extensive form

The extensive form can be used to formalize games with a time sequencing of moves. Games here are played on trees (as pictured here). Here each vertex (or node) represents a point of choice for a player. The player is specified by a number listed by the vertex. The lines out of the vertex represent a possible action for that player. The payoffs are specified at the bottom of the tree. The extensive form can be viewed as a multi-player generalization of a decision tree. To solve any extensive form game, backward induction must be used. It involves working backward up the game tree to determine what a rational player would do at the last vertex of the tree, what the player with the previous move would do given that the player with the last move is rational, and so on until the first vertex of the tree is reached.

The game pictured consists of two players. Once Player 2 has made their choice, the game is considered finished and each player gets their respective payoff. Suppose that Player 1 chooses  and then Player 2 chooses : Player 1 then gets a payoff of "eight" (which in real-world terms can be interpreted in many ways, the simplest of which is in terms of money but could mean things such as eight days of vacation or eight countries conquered or even eight more opportunities to play the same game against other players) and Player 2 gets a payoff of "two".

The extensive form can also capture simultaneous-move games and games with imperfect information. To represent it, either a dotted line connects different vertices to represent them as being part of the same information set (i.e. the players do not know at which point they are), or a closed line is drawn around them. (See example in the imperfect information section.)

Normal form

The normal (or strategic form) game is usually represented by a matrix which shows the players, strategies, and payoffs (see the example to the right). More generally it can be represented by any function that associates a payoff for each player with every possible combination of actions. In the accompanying example there are two players; one chooses the row and the other chooses the column. Each player has two strategies, which are specified by the number of rows and the number of columns. The payoffs are provided in the interior. The first number is the payoff received by the row player (Player 1 in our example); the second is the payoff for the column player (Player 2 in our example). Suppose that Player 1 plays Up and that Player 2 plays Left. Then Player 1 gets a payoff of 4, and Player 2 gets 3.

When a game is presented in normal form, it is presumed that each player acts simultaneously or, at least, without knowing the actions of the other. If players have some information about the choices of other players, the game is usually presented in extensive form.

Every extensive-form game has an equivalent normal-form game, however, the transformation to normal form may result in an exponential blowup in the size of the representation, making it computationally impractical.

Characteristic function form

In games that possess removable utility, separate rewards are not given; rather, the characteristic function decides the payoff of each unity. The idea is that the unity that is 'empty', so to speak, does not receive a reward at all.

The origin of this form is to be found in John von Neumann and Oskar Morgenstern's book; when looking at these instances, they guessed that when a union  appears, it works against the fraction

as if two individuals were playing a normal game. The balanced payoff of C is a basic function. Although there are differing examples that help determine coalitional amounts from normal games, not all appear that in their function form can be derived from such.

Such characteristic functions have expanded to describe games where there is no removable utility.

Alternative game representations

Alternative game representation forms are used for some subclasses of games or adjusted to the needs of interdisciplinary research. In addition to classical game representations, some of the alternative representations also encode time related aspects.

General and applied uses

As a method of applied mathematics, game theory has been used to study a wide variety of human and animal behaviors. It was initially developed in economics to understand a large collection of economic behaviors, including behaviors of firms, markets, and consumers. The first use of game-theoretic analysis was by Antoine Augustin Cournot in 1838 with his solution of the Cournot duopoly. The use of game theory in the social sciences has expanded, and game theory has been applied to political, sociological, and psychological behaviors as well.

Although pre-twentieth-century naturalists such as Charles Darwin made game-theoretic kinds of statements, the use of game-theoretic analysis in biology began with Ronald Fisher's studies of animal behavior during the 1930s. This work predates the name "game theory", but it shares many important features with this field. The developments in economics were later applied to biology largely by John Maynard Smith in his 1982 book Evolution and the Theory of Games.

In addition to being used to describe, predict, and explain behavior, game theory has also been used to develop theories of ethical or normative behavior and to prescribe such behavior. In economics and philosophy, scholars have applied game theory to help in the understanding of good or proper behavior. Game-theoretic arguments of this type can be found as far back as Plato. An alternative version of game theory, called chemical game theory, represents the player's choices as metaphorical chemical reactant molecules called "knowlecules".  Chemical game theory then calculates the outcomes as equilibrium solutions to a system of chemical reactions.

Description and modeling

The primary use of game theory is to describe and model how human populations behave. Some scholars believe that by finding the equilibria of games they can predict how actual human populations will behave when confronted with situations analogous to the game being studied. This particular view of game theory has been criticized. It is argued that the assumptions made by game theorists are often violated when applied to real-world situations. Game theorists usually assume players act rationally, but in practice, human rationality and/or behavior often deviates from the model of rationality as used in game theory. Game theorists respond by comparing their assumptions to those used in physics. Thus while their assumptions do not always hold, they can treat game theory as a reasonable scientific ideal akin to the models used by physicists. However, empirical work has shown that in some classic games, such as the centipede game, guess 2/3 of the average game, and the dictator game, people regularly do not play Nash equilibria. There is an ongoing debate regarding the importance of these experiments and whether the analysis of the experiments fully captures all aspects of the relevant situation.

Some game theorists, following the work of John Maynard Smith and George R. Price, have turned to evolutionary game theory in order to resolve these issues. These models presume either no rationality or bounded rationality on the part of players. Despite the name, evolutionary game theory does not necessarily presume natural selection in the biological sense. Evolutionary game theory includes both biological as well as cultural evolution and also models of individual learning (for example, fictitious play dynamics).

Prescriptive or normative analysis

Some scholars see game theory not as a predictive tool for the behavior of human beings, but as a suggestion for how people ought to behave. Since a strategy, corresponding to a Nash equilibrium of a game constitutes one's best response to the actions of the other players – provided they are in (the same) Nash equilibrium – playing a strategy that is part of a Nash equilibrium seems appropriate. This normative use of game theory has also come under criticism.

Economics and business

Game theory is a major method used in mathematical economics and business for modeling competing behaviors of interacting agents. Applications include a wide array of economic phenomena and approaches, such as auctions, bargaining, mergers and acquisitions pricing, fair division, duopolies, oligopolies, social network formation, agent-based computational economics, general equilibrium, mechanism design, and voting systems; and across such broad areas as experimental economics, behavioral economics, information economics, industrial organization, and political economy.

This research usually focuses on particular sets of strategies known as "solution concepts" or "equilibria". A common assumption is that players act rationally. In non-cooperative games, the most famous of these is the Nash equilibrium. A set of strategies is a Nash equilibrium if each represents a best response to the other strategies. If all the players are playing the strategies in a Nash equilibrium, they have no unilateral incentive to deviate, since their strategy is the best they can do given what others are doing.

The payoffs of the game are generally taken to represent the utility of individual players.

A prototypical paper on game theory in economics begins by presenting a game that is an abstraction of a particular economic situation. One or more solution concepts are chosen, and the author demonstrates which strategy sets in the presented game are equilibria of the appropriate type. Economists and business professors suggest two primary uses (noted above): descriptive and prescriptive.

The Chartered Institute of Procurement & Supply (CIPS) promotes knowledge and use of game theory within the context of business procurement. CIPS and TWS Partners have conducted a series of surveys designed to explore the understanding, awareness and application of game theory among procurement professionals. Some of the main findings in their third annual survey (2019) include:
application of game theory to procurement activity has increased – at the time it was at 19% across all survey respondents
65% of participants predict that use of game theory applications will grow
70% of respondents say that they have "only a basic or a below basic understanding" of game theory
20% of participants had undertaken on-the-job training in game theory
50% of respondents said that new or improved software solutions were desirable
90% of respondents said that they do not have the software they need for their work.

Project management

Sensible decision-making is critical for the success of projects.  In project management, game theory is used to model the decision-making process of players, such as investors, project managers, contractors, sub-contractors, governments and customers.  Quite often, these players have competing interests, and sometimes their interests are directly detrimental to other players, making project management scenarios well-suited to be modeled by game theory.

Piraveenan (2019) in his review provides several examples where game theory is used to model project management scenarios. For instance, an investor typically has several investment options, and each option will likely result in a different project, and thus one of the investment options has to be chosen before the project charter can be produced. Similarly, any large project involving subcontractors, for instance, a construction project, has a complex interplay between the main contractor (the project manager) and subcontractors, or among the subcontractors themselves, which typically has several decision points. For example, if there is an ambiguity in the contract between the contractor and subcontractor, each must decide how hard to push their case without jeopardizing the whole project, and thus their own stake in it. Similarly, when projects from competing organizations are launched, the marketing personnel have to decide what is the best timing and strategy to market the project, or its resultant product or service, so that it can gain maximum traction in the face of competition. In each of these scenarios, the required decisions depend on the decisions of other players who, in some way, have competing interests to the interests of the decision-maker, and thus can ideally be modeled using game theory.

Piraveenan summarises that two-player games are predominantly used to model project management scenarios, and based on the identity of these players, five distinct types of games are used in project management.

 Government-sector–private-sector games (games that model public–private partnerships)
 Contractor–contractor games
 Contractor–subcontractor games
 Subcontractor–subcontractor games
 Games involving other players

In terms of types of games, both cooperative as well as non-cooperative, normal-form as well as extensive-form, and zero-sum as well as non-zero-sum  are used to model various project management scenarios.

Political science
The application of game theory to political science is focused in the overlapping areas of fair division, political economy, public choice, war bargaining, positive political theory, and social choice theory. In each of these areas, researchers have developed game-theoretic models in which the players are often voters, states, special interest groups, and politicians.

Early examples of game theory applied to political science are provided by Anthony Downs. In his 1957 book An Economic Theory of Democracy, he applies the Hotelling firm location model to the political process. In the Downsian model, political candidates commit to ideologies on a one-dimensional policy space. Downs first shows how the political candidates will converge to the ideology preferred by the median voter if voters are fully informed, but then argues that voters choose to remain rationally ignorant which allows for candidate divergence. Game theory was applied in 1962 to the Cuban Missile Crisis during the presidency of John F. Kennedy.

It has also been proposed that game theory explains the stability of any form of political government.  Taking the simplest case of a monarchy, for example, the king, being only one person, does not and cannot maintain his authority by personally exercising physical control over all or even any significant number of his subjects.  Sovereign control is instead explained by the recognition by each citizen that all other citizens expect each other to view the king (or other established government) as the person whose orders will be followed.  Coordinating communication among citizens to replace the sovereign is effectively barred, since conspiracy to replace the sovereign is generally punishable as a crime.  Thus, in a process that can be modeled by variants of the prisoner's dilemma, during periods of stability no citizen will find it rational to move to replace the sovereign, even if all the citizens know they would be better off if they were all to act collectively.

A game-theoretic explanation for democratic peace is that public and open debate in democracies sends clear and reliable information regarding their intentions to other states. In contrast, it is difficult to know the intentions of nondemocratic leaders, what effect concessions will have, and if promises will be kept. Thus there will be mistrust and unwillingness to make concessions if at least one of the parties in a dispute is a non-democracy.

However, game theory predicts that two countries may still go to war even if their leaders are cognizant of the costs of fighting. War may result from asymmetric information; two countries may have incentives to mis-represent the amount of military resources they have on hand, rendering them unable to settle disputes agreeably without resorting to fighting. Moreover, war may arise because of commitment problems: if two countries wish to settle a dispute via peaceful means, but each wishes to go back on the terms of that settlement, they may have no choice but to resort to warfare. Finally, war may result from issue indivisibilities.

Game theory could also help predict a nation's responses when there is a new rule or law to be applied to that nation. One example is Peter John Wood's (2013) research looking into what nations could do to help reduce climate change. Wood thought this could be accomplished by making treaties with other nations to reduce greenhouse gas emissions. However, he concluded that this idea could not work because it would create a prisoner's dilemma for the nations.

Biology

Unlike those in economics, the payoffs for games in biology are often interpreted as corresponding to fitness. In addition, the focus has been less on equilibria that correspond to a notion of rationality and more on ones that would be maintained by evolutionary forces. Although its initial motivation did not involve any of the mental requirements of the Nash equilibrium, every ESS is a Nash equilibrium.

In biology, game theory has been used as a model to understand many different phenomena. It was first used to explain the evolution (and stability) of the approximate 1:1 sex ratios.  suggested that the 1:1 sex ratios are a result of evolutionary forces acting on individuals who could be seen as trying to maximize their number of grandchildren.

Additionally, biologists have used evolutionary game theory and the ESS to explain the emergence of animal communication. The analysis of signaling games and other communication games has provided insight into the evolution of communication among animals. For example, the mobbing behavior of many species, in which a large number of prey animals attack a larger predator, seems to be an example of spontaneous emergent organization. Ants have also been shown to exhibit feed-forward behavior akin to fashion (see Paul Ormerod's Butterfly Economics).

Biologists have used the game of chicken to analyze fighting behavior and territoriality.

According to Maynard Smith, in the preface to Evolution and the Theory of Games, "paradoxically, it has turned out that game theory is more readily applied to biology than to the field of economic behaviour for which it was originally designed". Evolutionary game theory has been used to explain many seemingly incongruous phenomena in nature.

One such phenomenon is known as biological altruism. This is a situation in which an organism appears to act in a way that benefits other organisms and is detrimental to itself. This is distinct from traditional notions of altruism because such actions are not conscious, but appear to be evolutionary adaptations to increase overall fitness. Examples can be found in species ranging from vampire bats that regurgitate blood they have obtained from a night's hunting and give it to group members who have failed to feed, to worker bees that care for the queen bee for their entire lives and never mate, to vervet monkeys that warn group members of a predator's approach, even when it endangers that individual's chance of survival. All of these actions increase the overall fitness of a group, but occur at a cost to the individual.

Evolutionary game theory explains this altruism with the idea of kin selection. Altruists discriminate between the individuals they help and favor relatives. Hamilton's rule explains the evolutionary rationale behind this selection with the equation , where the cost  to the altruist must be less than the benefit  to the recipient multiplied by the coefficient of relatedness . The more closely related two organisms are causes the incidences of altruism to increase because they share many of the same alleles. This means that the altruistic individual, by ensuring that the alleles of its close relative are passed on through survival of its offspring, can forgo the option of having offspring itself because the same number of alleles are passed on. Ensuring that enough of a sibling's offspring survive to adulthood precludes the necessity of the altruistic individual producing offspring. Similarly if it is considered that information other than that of a genetic nature (e.g. epigenetics, religion, science, etc.) persisted through time the playing field becomes larger still, and the discrepancies smaller.

Computer science and logic
Game theory has come to play an increasingly important role in logic and in computer science. Several logical theories have a basis in game semantics. In addition, computer scientists have used games to model interactive computations. Also, game theory provides a theoretical basis to the field of multi-agent systems.

Separately, game theory has played a role in online algorithms; in particular, the -server problem, which has in the past been referred to as games with moving costs and request-answer games. Yao's principle is a game-theoretic technique for proving lower bounds on the computational complexity of randomized algorithms, especially online algorithms.

The emergence of the Internet has motivated the development of algorithms for finding equilibria in games, markets, computational auctions, peer-to-peer systems, and security and information markets. Algorithmic game theory and within it algorithmic mechanism design combine computational algorithm design and analysis of complex systems with economic theory.

Philosophy

Game theory has been put to several uses in philosophy. In so doing, he provided the first analysis of common knowledge and employed it in analyzing play in coordination games. In addition, he first suggested that one can understand meaning in terms of signaling games. This later suggestion has been pursued by several philosophers since Lewis. Following  game-theoretic account of conventions, Edna Ullmann-Margalit (1977) and Bicchieri (2006) have developed theories of social norms that define them as Nash equilibria that result from transforming a mixed-motive game into a coordination game.

Game theory has also challenged philosophers to think in terms of interactive epistemology: what it means for a collective to have common beliefs or knowledge, and what are the consequences of this knowledge for the social outcomes resulting from the interactions of agents. Philosophers who have worked in this area include Bicchieri (1989, 1993), Skyrms (1990), and Stalnaker (1999).

In ethics, some (most notably David Gauthier, Gregory Kavka, and Jean Hampton)  authors have attempted to pursue Thomas Hobbes' project of deriving morality from self-interest. Since games like the prisoner's dilemma present an apparent conflict between morality and self-interest, explaining why cooperation is required by self-interest is an important component of this project. This general strategy is a component of the general social contract view in political philosophy (for examples, see  and ).

Other authors have attempted to use evolutionary game theory in order to explain the emergence of human attitudes about morality and corresponding animal behaviors. These authors look at several games including the prisoner's dilemma, stag hunt, and the Nash bargaining game as providing an explanation for the emergence of attitudes about morality (see, e.g.,  and ).

Retail and consumer product pricing 
Game theory applications are often used in the pricing strategies of retail and consumer markets, particularly for the sale of inelastic goods. With retailers constantly competing against one another for consumer market share, it has become a fairly common practice for retailers to discount certain goods, intermittently, in the hopes of increasing foot-traffic in brick and mortar locations (websites visits for e-commerce retailers) or increasing sales of ancillary or complimentary products.

Black Friday, a popular shopping holiday in the US, is when many retailers focus on optimal pricing strategies to capture the holiday shopping market. In the Black Friday scenario, retailers using game theory applications typically ask "what is the dominant competitor's reaction to me?" In such a scenario, the game has two players: the retailer, and the consumer. The retailer is focused on an optimal pricing strategy, while the consumer is focused on the best deal. In this closed system, there often is no dominant strategy as both players have alternative options. That is, retailers can find a different customer, and consumers can shop at a different retailer. Given the market competition that day, however, the dominant strategy for retailers lies in outperforming competitors. The open system assumes multiple retailers selling similar goods, and a finite number of consumers demanding the goods at an optimal price. A blog by a Cornell University professor provided an example of such a strategy, when Amazon priced a Samsung TV $100 below retail value, effectively undercutting competitors. Amazon made up part of the difference by increasing the price of HDMI cables, as it has been found that consumers are less price discriminatory when it comes to the sale of secondary items.

Retail markets continue to evolve strategies and applications of game theory when it comes to pricing consumer goods. The key insights found between simulations in a controlled environment and real-world retail experiences show that the applications of such strategies are more complex, as each retailer has to find an optimal balance between pricing, supplier relations, brand image, and the potential to cannibalize the sale of more profitable items.

Epidemiology
Since the decision to take a vaccine for a particular disease is often made by individuals, who may consider a range of factors and parameters in making this decision (such as the incidence and prevalence of the disease, perceived and real risks associated with contracting the disease,  mortality rate, perceived and real risks associated with vaccination, and financial cost of vaccination), game theory has been used to model and predict vaccination uptake in a society.

In popular culture
 Based on the 1998 book by Sylvia Nasar, the life story of game theorist and mathematician John Nash was turned into the 2001 biopic A Beautiful Mind, starring Russell Crowe as Nash.
 The 1959 military science fiction novel Starship Troopers by Robert A. Heinlein mentioned "games theory" and "theory of games". In the 1997 film of the same name, the character Carl Jenkins referred to his military intelligence assignment as being assigned to "games and theory".
 The 1964 film Dr. Strangelove satirizes game theoretic ideas about deterrence theory. For example, nuclear deterrence depends on the threat to retaliate catastrophically if a nuclear attack is detected. A game theorist might argue that such threats can fail to be credible, in the sense that they can lead to subgame imperfect equilibria. The movie takes this idea one step further, with the Soviet Union irrevocably committing to a catastrophic nuclear response without making the threat public.
 The 1980s power pop band Game Theory was founded by singer/songwriter Scott Miller, who described the band's name as alluding to "the study of calculating the most appropriate action given an adversary... to give yourself the minimum amount of failure".
 Liar Game, a 2005 Japanese manga and 2007 television series, presents the main characters in each episode with a game or problem that is typically drawn from game theory, as demonstrated by the strategies applied by the characters.
 The 1974 novel Spy Story by Len Deighton explores elements of game theory in regard to cold war army exercises.
 The 2008 novel The Dark Forest by Liu Cixin explores the relationship between extraterrestrial life, humanity, and game theory.
 The prime antagonist Joker in the movie The Dark Knight presents game theory concepts—notably the prisoner's dilemma in a scene where he asks passengers in two different ferries to bomb the other one to save their own.
 In the 2018 film Crazy Rich Asians, the female lead Rachel Chu is a professor of economics and game theory at New York University. At the beginning of the film she is seen in her NYU classroom playing a game of poker with her teaching assistant and wins the game by bluffing;  then in the climax of the film, she plays a game of mahjong with her boy friend's disapproving mother Eleanor, losing the game to Eleanor on purpose but winning her approval as a result.

See also

 Applied ethics
 Bandwidth-sharing game
 Chainstore paradox
 Collective intentionality
 Glossary of game theory
 Intra-household bargaining
 Kingmaker scenario
 Law and economics
 Outline of artificial intelligence
 Parrondo's paradox
 Precautionary principle
 Quantum refereed game
 Risk management
 Self-confirming equilibrium
 Tragedy of the commons
 Traveler's dilemma
 Wilson doctrine (economics)

Lists
 List of cognitive biases
 List of emerging technologies
 List of games in game theory

Notes

References

Further reading

Textbooks and general literature
 .
 , Description.
 . Suitable for undergraduate and business students.
 . Suitable for upper-level undergraduates.
 . Suitable for advanced undergraduates.
 
 . Presents game theory in formal way suitable for graduate level.
 Joseph E. Harrington (2008) Games, strategies, and decision making, Worth, . Textbook suitable for undergraduates in applied fields; numerous examples, fewer formalisms in concept presentation.
 
 
Maschler, Michael; Solan, Eilon; Zamir, Shmuel (2013), Game Theory, Cambridge University Press, . Undergraduate textbook.
 . Suitable for a general audience.
 . Undergraduate textbook.
 . A modern introduction at the graduate level.
 
 . A leading textbook at the advanced undergraduate level.
 
  Consistent treatment of game types usually claimed by different applied fields, e.g. Markov decision processes.

Historically important texts
 
 
 
 

 
reprinted edition: 
 
 
 
 Shapley, L.S. (1953), A Value for n-person Games, In: Contributions to the Theory of Games volume II, H. W. Kuhn and A. W. Tucker (eds.)
 Shapley, L.S. (1953), Stochastic Games, Proceedings of National Academy of Science Vol. 39, pp. 1095–1100.
  English translation: "On the Theory of Games of Strategy," in A. W. Tucker and R. D. Luce, ed. (1959), Contributions to the Theory of Games, v. 4, p. 42. Princeton University Press.

Other material
 
 
 
 Allan Gibbard, "Manipulation of voting schemes: a general result", Econometrica, Vol. 41, No. 4 (1973), pp. 587–601.
 
 
 ,  (2002 edition)
 . A layman's introduction.
 .

External links

 James Miller (2015): Introductory Game Theory Videos.
 
 Paul Walker: History of Game Theory Page.
 David Levine: Game Theory. Papers, Lecture Notes and much more stuff.
 Alvin Roth:  — Comprehensive list of links to game theory information on the Web
 Adam Kalai: Game Theory and Computer Science — Lecture notes on Game Theory and Computer Science
 Mike Shor: GameTheory.net — Lecture notes, interactive illustrations and other information.
 Jim Ratliff's Graduate Course in Game Theory (lecture notes).
 Don Ross: Review Of Game Theory in the Stanford Encyclopedia of Philosophy.
 Bruno Verbeek and Christopher Morris: Game Theory and Ethics
 Elmer G. Wiens: Game Theory — Introduction, worked examples, play online two-person zero-sum games.
 Marek M. Kaminski: Game Theory and Politics — Syllabuses and lecture notes for game theory and political science.
 Websites on game theory and social interactions
 Kesten Green's  — See Papers for evidence on the accuracy of forecasts from game theory and other methods .
 McKelvey, Richard D., McLennan, Andrew M., and Turocy, Theodore L. (2007) Gambit: Software Tools for Game Theory.
 Benjamin Polak: Open Course on Game Theory at Yale  videos of the course
 Benjamin Moritz, Bernhard Könsgen, Danny Bures, Ronni Wiersch, (2007) Spieltheorie-Software.de: An application for Game Theory implemented in JAVA.
 Antonin Kucera: Stochastic Two-Player Games.
 Yu-Chi Ho: What is Mathematical Game Theory; What is Mathematical Game Theory (#2); What is Mathematical Game Theory (#3); What is Mathematical Game Theory (#4)-Many person game theory; What is Mathematical Game Theory ?( #5) – Finale, summing up, and my own view

 
Artificial intelligence
Formal sciences
Mathematical economics
John von Neumann